Complex modulus may refer to:

 Modulus of complex number, in mathematics, the norm or absolute value, of a complex number: 
 Dynamic modulus, in materials engineering, the ratio of stress to strain under vibratory conditions